Sergio Juste Marín (born 12 January 1992), also known as Chechi, is a Spanish footballer who plays for FE Grama. Mainly a central defender, he can also play as a right-back.

Club career

Gimnàstic
Born in Tarragona, Catalonia, Juste began playing football with FC Barcelona, moving in early 2009 to neighbouring Gimnàstic de Tarragona to complete his development. On 20 June of that year, at just 17, he made his senior debut, playing 32 minutes in a 1–0 away loss against SD Eibar after having come on as a substitute for Nebojša Marinković.

In 2011–12, with the club still in the Segunda División, Juste was promoted to the main squad – after spending several years with farm team CF Pobla de Mafumet – after an injury crisis, and started the first match of the season on 28 August, against Real Valladolid.

Barcelona
In late June 2012, after Nàstic suffered relegation, Juste returned to his first club Barcelona, signing a two-year contract and being assigned to the reserves. However, on 15 July, the former announced that he would return for preseason play.

On 6 August 2012, Gimnàstic and Barça reached an agreement for Juste, and he agreed to a three-year deal with a €12 million buyout clause. He picked up an injury in mid-August, only returning on 8 January 2013; he was again downed by physical problems shortly after, this time in the knee, being sidelined for the rest of the campaign.

Juste damaged his anterior cruciate ligament on 20 August 2013, going on to miss a further several months. He finally made his debut for Barcelona B on 31 May of the following year, playing the last three minutes of a 4–3 home win over AD Alcorcón.

Despite appearing in just one match in two years, Juste was named the B team's captain on 22 August 2014.

Goa
Juste moved abroad for the first time on 14 August 2017, signing for Indian Super League franchise FC Goa. He scored his only goal for them on 28 February 2018, opening the 5–1 home defeat of ATK.

International career
On 31 December 2011, Juste made his debut for Catalonia, in a friendly with Tunisia.

Career statistics

References

External links

1992 births
Living people
Sportspeople from Tarragona
Spanish footballers
Footballers from Catalonia
Association football defenders
Segunda División players
Segunda División B players
Tercera División players
Tercera Federación players
CF Pobla de Mafumet footballers
Gimnàstic de Tarragona footballers
FC Barcelona Atlètic players
CE L'Hospitalet players
Indian Super League players
FC Goa players
Catalonia international footballers
Spanish expatriate footballers
Expatriate footballers in India
Spanish expatriate sportspeople in India